Aska Hundred, or Aska härad, was a hundred of Östergötland in Sweden.

Hundreds of Östergötland